Edward Bruce Watson (born 16 October 1950) is an American geochemist at Rensselaer Polytechnic Institute in Troy, New York.

Education and career
Watson received in 1972 his bachelor's degree in geology from the  University of New Hampshire and in 1976 his Ph.D. from the Massachusetts Institute of Technology in geochemistry. As a postdoc, he worked at the Carnegie Institution of Washington. In 1977 became an assistant professor of geochemistry at Rensselaer Polytechnic Institute and was subsequently promoted to associate professor and full professor. Since 2011 he has also held a professorship of materials science and engineering. He was a visiting researcher in 1980 at Macquarie University in Sydney and in 1984 at the Max Planck Institute for Chemistry in Mainz.

Watson's research deals (mostly but not exclusively) with the geochemistry of the deep Earth inaccessible to drilling or other direct observation. He studies the chemical composition and materials present in these deep regions and their changes over geologic time. The geochemistry of Earth's deep crust and upper mantle (down to depths of about 150 kilometers) are studied in his laboratory through the design and execution of experiments involving high temperatures and high pressures.

His research has included the following topics:

Awards and honors
1983 — F.W. Clarke Medal of the Geochemical Society
1996 — Fellow of the American Academy of Arts and Sciences
1997 — Member of the National Academy of Sciences
1998 — President of the Mineralogical Society of America (one year term)
1998 — Arthur L. Day Medal, Geological Society of America
1999 — R.A. Daly Lecturer, American Geophysical Union
2005 — V. M. Goldschmidt Award of the Geochemical Society
2006 — Walter H. Bucher Medal, American Geophysical Union
2011 — Murchison Medal, Geological Society of London
2018 — Roebling Medal, Mineralogical Society of America

References

American geochemists
University of New Hampshire alumni
Massachusetts Institute of Technology School of Science alumni
Rensselaer Polytechnic Institute faculty
Fellows of the American Academy of Arts and Sciences
Members of the United States National Academy of Sciences
1950 births
Living people
Recipients of the V. M. Goldschmidt Award